Clarence Richard Silva (born August 6, 1949), known as Larry Silva, is an American prelate of the Roman Catholic Church.  He has been serving as bishop of the Diocese of Honolulu since 2005.    

Silva is the first priest born in Hawaii to become bishop of Honolulu and the second one of Portuguese/Azorean ancestry. Previous to becoming bishop, Silva served as a diocesan priest and later vicar general of the Diocese of Oakland in California.

Biography

Early life 
Silva was born on August 6, 1949, on Oahu, Hawaii, to electrician and refrigeration mechanic Richard Silva and homemaker Catherine Alves Silva at Saint Francis Hospital in Liliha.  He is the great grandson of immigrants from the Azores. Silva was baptized at Saint Anthony Church in Kailua, Hawaii, but his family moved to California during his first year of life.  He attended Saint John the Baptist School in San Lorenzo, California, and Bishop O'Dowd High School in Oakland, California.    

Convinced of a calling to the priesthood, Silva entered Saint Joseph College Seminary in Mountain View, California, obtaining a Bachelor of Arts degree.  He then attended Saint Patrick Seminary in Menlo Park, California, where he obtained a Master of Divinity degree.

Priesthood 
Silva was ordained a priest for the Diocese of Oakland on May 2, 1975, by Bishop Floyd  Begin. Silva studied Spanish language in Cuernavaca, Mexico in 1975 and 1978. After his ordination, Silva served several pastoral assignments in California parishes:

 Saint Bernard in Oakland from 1975 to 1978
 Our Lady of the Rosary in Union City from 1978 to 1979 
 Saint Bede in Hayward from 1983 to 1984 
 Saint Peter Martyr in Pittsburg from 1984 to 1986 
 and Saint Anthony in Oakland from 1986 to 1991  

During his first sabbatical leave in 1991, Silva studied at the Pontifical North American College in Rome. After returning to Oakland, Silva had more pastoral assignments:

 Saint John the Baptist in El Cerrito from 1991 to 1994 
 Saint Andrew and Saint Joseph in Oakland from 1994 to 1999
 Saint Leonard and Saint Paula in Fremont from 2000 to 2003  

Employing parish clustering, Sllva served as pastor of two parishes at a time. He oversaw the merger of two parishes into one several times. Silva also served as vocations director from 1979 to 1983.  He recruited religious brothers and priests for the diocese.  In 2003, Bishop Allen Vigneron appointed Silva as his vicar general and moderator of the curia.  Silva was instrumental in the planning for the construction of the Cathedral of Christ the Light. It replaced the Cathedral of Saint Francis de Sales, destroyed in the Loma Prieta earthquake on October 17, 1989.

Bishop of Honolulu 
Pope Benedict XVI appointed Silva on May 17, 2005, as bishop of the Diocese of Honolulu.  Silva was consecrated on July 21, 2005 at the Neal S. Blaisdell Center in Honolulu by Archbishop William Levada.  The co-consecrators were Bishop Vigneron and Bishop John Cummins  Silva's episcopal motto was: "Witness to Jesus" from Revelation 19:10.

In April 2020, Silva announced during a Sunday mass that the diocese was paying millions to settle prior sex abuse cases. Silva also acknowledged that the diocese was still facing a large of number of sex abuse lawsuits as well.

Silva was a principal promoter for the causes of sainthood for Father Damien and Sister Marianne Cope, both of whom cared for leprosy patients on the island of Molokai.  One of his first acts as bishop-elect was to travel to Kalaupapa on Moloka'i on May 19, 2005 to pay homage to Damien and Cope.  Cope had been beatified by Benedict XVI on May 14, 2005.  Speaking of his trip, Silva said, "I will let that empower me in my ministry to the people of Hawai'i.  Damien has been my hero since I was a boy."  Silva's great grandfather had been a patient of the leper colony.

After the 2009 canonization of Damien and the 2012 canonization of Cope, Silva became the only bishop in American history to have two individuals from his diocese made saints during his episcopate.

Honors 
Silva was inducted into the Order of the Holy Sepulchre in 2005 and holds the rank of grand officer.  He is also a member of the Sovereign Military Order of Malta. In a June 2013 ceremony at the Cathedral of Our Lady of Peace in Honolulu, Silva was inducted into the Royal Order of Kamehameha I with the rank of knight companion.  The citation said that Silva had: "...gained the respect and admiration of the High Chiefs, Chief, Officers, Mamo Hawaii and Na Wahine Hui o Kamehameha I for his ecumenical spirit of aloha, kindness sensitivity to our island ways and for his love of the Hawaiian culture and all the cultures for people from around the world who call Hawaii home."

Coat of Arms 
The episcopal coat-of-arms for Silva was designed by Father Quang Dong and Thanh Dong. Silva means "forest" in Portuguese.  The sinister impalement contains three trees in the "forest"; the kukui (Aleurites mollucana) on the right, symbolizing Hawaii, the birthplace of Silva, his parents and grandparents.  The kukui yields an oil with healing properties that also provides light; the oak (Quercus alba) on the left, symbolizing Oakland (Quercopolitana) where Silva grew up and where he served as a priest for 30 years; and the cross - the tree of life - in the center, with olive leaves symbolizing Malia O Ka Malu (Mary, Queen of Peace), patroness of the Diocese of Honolulu.

See also

 Catholic Church hierarchy
 Catholic Church in the United States
 Historical list of the Catholic bishops of the United States
 List of Catholic bishops of the United States
 Lists of patriarchs, archbishops, and bishops

References

External links
Roman Catholic Diocese of Honolulu Official Site
Allen Henry Vigneron Statement of Silva Appointment on 17 May 2005
United States Conference of Catholic Bishops Statement of Silva Appointment on 17 May 2005
 Vatican Statement of Silva Appointment on 17 May 2005
 Honolulu Advertiser Preview of the Ordination and Installation Ceremony on 25 May 2005
 Hawaii Catholic Herald, July 15, 2005 - Special Edition for the Installation and Ordination of Bishop Clarence Silva

Episcopal succession

1949 births
Living people
Saint Patrick's Seminary and University alumni
Roman Catholic bishops of Honolulu
People from Oakland, California
American people of Azorean descent
21st-century Roman Catholic bishops in the United States
Knights of Malta
Members of the Order of the Holy Sepulchre
Catholics from California
American people of Portuguese descent